St Mary's Maguiresbridge is a Roman Catholic Chapel in Maguiresbridge, County Fermanagh, Northern Ireland, erected in 1822 at an expense of £800. The Church's main source of light is pointed windows, and the altar is embellished with a painting.  Attached to the Chapel is a school building.

References

County Fermanagh
Roman Catholic churches in Northern Ireland
19th-century churches in Northern Ireland